Thirudan Police (Thief and Police) is a 2014 Indian Tamil language action comedy film, directed by debutant Caarthick Raju. Produced by S. P. B. Charan in collaboration with J. Selvakumar of Kenanya films, the film has Dinesh and Aishwarya Rajesh in the lead and music scored by Yuvan Shankar Raja, while Bala Saravanan, Nithin Sathya, John Vijay and Rajendran play supporting roles. According to the director, the film is about a son exacting revenge for his father's death. The film was launched in December 2013, and released on 14 November 2014. The film was remade in Telugu as Sapthagiri Express with Sapthagiri and in Kannada as Khiladi Police with Harish Raj.

Cast 

 Dinesh as Vishwa
 Aishwarya Rajesh as Poornima
 Bala Saravanan as Vanagamudi
 Nithin Sathya as Ekambaram's son
 Rajendran as Manickam
 John Vijay as Maravattai
 Aadukalam Naren as Police Commissioner
 Rajesh as Singaram
 Renuka as Vishwa's mother
 Uma as ACP's wife
 Vazhakku En Muthuraman as ACP Ekambaram
 Krishnamoorthy as a police officer
 Rajendranath
 Robo Chandru as a police officer
 Hello Kandasamy as Tea stall owner
 Vaiyapuri (Guest appearance)
 S. P. Balasubrahmanyam as Professor (Guest appearance)
 Vijay Sethupathi (Guest appearance)
 Aruldoss as Councilor (Guest appearance)

Production 
Caarthick Raju stated "For 14 years, I have been involved in visual effects and computer graphics for several films. Then came a stage when I wanted to do something more creative. With encouragement from my friend, cinematographer Velraj, I started writing scripts and learning about direction. When the time was right, I approached S. P. B. Charan for whom I had earlier worked on visual effects, and he showed a keen interest in the concept I had built into my script". The director stated that the film is about a son exacting revenge for his father's death and that the story is "how hide-and-seek continues to be played in adulthood when a thief and a cop come head-to-head". While Dinesh was signed to play the son, "a carefree boy with no responsibilities" who later becomes a police officer, Rajesh was cast as the father. Dinesh was reported to appear in four looks and was trained by a constable friend to get his body language right for the policeman's role. Shruti Hassan was signed to play the role of a college student, whose father is a sub-inspector.

The team traveled to Kodaikanal to shoot a duet song featuring Dinesh and Iyshwarya. It was shot in a few hilly locations, about 25  km away from Kodaikanal. Vijay Sethupathi has danced for the Kuthu number, "Ennoda Vaa (kutthaattam Podu)" from the film. The song was shot at Kerala House, near VGP in Chennai.

Soundtrack

The film's soundtrack was composed by Yuvan Shankar Raja. The album features five tracks and was released on 10 July 2014 at Sathyam Cinemas, Chennai. The song "Moodupanikkul" was one of the song originally composed by Yuvan Shankar Raja for the film Aaranya Kaandam that was also produced by S. P. Charan and that eventually released without any songs. Besides Charan two Airtel Super Singer contestants, Hariharasudhan and Pooja Vaidyanath, had also sung for Thirudan Police'''s soundtrack.

Reception

The soundtrack received positive response. The Times of India gave it a rating of 3 stars and wrote, "Yuvan Shankar Raja's previous albums didn't really strike a chord with the listeners, but this one looks quite promising. Yuvan has kept his trademark compositions yet gives a fresh feel to this five-track album".

Release
The satellite rights of the film were sold to Sun TV.

Critical reception
The movie has mostly received positive reviews from critics.  IANS gave the film 3.5 stars out of 5 and wrote, "Thirudan Police is your average revenge drama that gets salvaged by some great comedy, the kind audiences don't mind paying for....(it)shows how comedy can do wonders in a story if one knows how to use it".
Rediff gave 3 stars out of 5 and wrote, "He (Caarthick Raju) has cleverly refined in every element, be it action, comedy, romance or emotion, keeping it light, interesting and highly entertaining", calling the film "a delight to watch" and "definitely a commendable effort". Sify called the film "a nice fun ride" and further added, "It is well-written comedy entertainer which also has a strong emotional story about the bonding between a father and son. And also an entertaining hide and seek thriller featuring a cop with a vengeance". Deccan Chronicle gave a rating of 2.5 stars and wrote, "For a debut directorial venture, Caarthick Raju's Thirudan Police is a commendable end product that manages to prop itself up as an entertaining thriller with a smidgen of comedy mixed in".

Baradwaj Rangan wrote, "the film's biggest (and nicest) surprise is that this revenge drama is treated like a comedy. Thirudan Police pees all over that most hallowed of tropes: the love for a parent. The upshot is that the narrative has no real emotional charge – but that's fine. The trouble is that this one-note gag (about Vishwa's father) is stretched out too long. Also, there are tonal issues...but the real problem is when the film gets all serious on us. But the climax is such fun that we forget what came earlier". The Hindu wrote, "Caarthick Raju's real strength is comedy. A Ramarajan-style punch quite early in the film...signals this. The climax sequences confirm it. You're happily willing to suspend all disbelief when the scenes are as funny as they are at the end... As you walk out, you can't but wonder if the director, after noting all the laughter at the end, rues his decision not to have made a full-fledged comedy". The Times of India gave 3 stars out of 5 and wrote, "Thirudan Police'' wants to be a sentimental story as well as a comedy. The tone is uneven — one moment we are asked to get sentimental and then in the next, we are told to laugh. This is jarring, as is the manner in which the film turns from an emotional father-son tale to a comedy. To the director's credit, he does this with confidence that we begin to enjoy the humour after initially feeling disconcerted". Cinemalead
gave a 3 out of 5 and wrote,"Taut police. A harmless watch for the weekend!"

References

External links 
 

2014 films
2014 action comedy films
Indian action comedy films
2010s Tamil-language films
Indian films about revenge
Films scored by Yuvan Shankar Raja
Tamil films remade in other languages
2014 directorial debut films
2014 comedy films
Films directed by Caarthick Raju